is a Japanese anime director.

Works

Director
Source:
Steel Jeeg (TV series, 1975–1976)
Jack and the Beanstalk (short film, 1975)
Grendizer, Getter Robo G, Great Mazinger: Kessen! Daikaijuu (film, 1976)
Bonjour Galaxy Express 999 (television film, 1979)
Cyborg 009: Legend of the Super Vortex (film, 1980)
 Arsene Lupin vs. Herlock Sholmes (television film, 1981)
Kaba Enchō no Dōbutsuen Nikki (ja) (television film, 1981)
Queen Millennia (film, 1982)
 Two Years' Vacation (television film, 1982)
Tatakae!! Ramenman (short film, 1988)
Tatakae!! Ramenman (TV series, 1988)
Saint Seiya: Saishū Seisen no Senshitachi (film, 1989)
Hoero Basukettoman Tamashii!! Hanamichi to Rukawa no Atsuki Natsu (film, 1995)

References

External links

Anime directors
Japanese film directors
Japanese television directors
Living people
Year of birth missing (living people)